A stadium is a two-dimensional geometric shape constructed of a rectangle with semicircles at a pair of opposite sides.
The same shape is known also as a pill shape,  discorectangle, squectangle, obround, or sausage body.

The shape is based on a stadium, a place used for athletics and horse racing tracks.

A stadium may be constructed as the Minkowski sum of a disk and a line segment. Alternatively, it is the neighborhood of points within a given distance from a line segment.
A stadium is a type of oval. However, unlike some other ovals such as the ellipses, it is not an algebraic curve because  different parts of its boundary are defined by different equations.

Formulas 
The perimeter of a stadium is calculated by the formula  where  a is the length of the straight sides and r is the radius of the semicircles.

Bunimovich stadium
When this shape is used in the study of dynamical billiards, it is called the Bunimovich stadium. Leonid Bunimovich used this shape to show that it is possible for billiard tracks to exhibit chaotic behavior (positive Lyapunov exponent and exponential divergence of paths) even within a convex billiard table.

Related shapes
A capsule is produced by revolving a stadium around the line of symmetry that bisects the semicircles.

References

External links 

Piecewise-circular curves